A , often abbreviated as VN, is a form of digital semi-interactive fiction. Visual novels are often associated with and used in the medium of video games, but are not always labeled as such themselves. They combine a textual narrative with static or animated illustrations and a varying degree of interactivity. The format is more rarely referred to as novel game, a retranscription of the wasei-eigo term , which is more often used in Japanese.

Visual novels originated in and are especially prevalent in Japan, where they made up nearly 70% of the PC game titles released in 2006. In Japanese, a distinction is often made between visual novels (NVL, from "novel"), which consist primarily of narration and have very few interactive elements, and adventure games (AVG or ADV, from "adventure"), which incorporate problem-solving and other types of gameplay. This distinction is normally lost outside Japan, as both visual novels and adventure games are commonly referred to as "visual novels" by international fans.

Visual novels are rarely produced exclusively for dedicated video game consoles, but the more popular games have occasionally been ported from PC (or a hardware equivalent) to systems such as the Sega Saturn, Dreamcast, PlayStation Portable, or Xbox 360. The more famous visual novels are also often adapted into light novels, manga or anime and are sometimes succeeded or complemented by actual video games, such as RPGs or action games set in the same universe. The market for visual novels outside of East Asia is small, though a number of anime based on visual novels are popular among anime fans in the Western world; examples include Clannad, Steins;Gate, and Fate/stay night.

Structure
Visual novels are distinguished from other game types by their generally minimal gameplay. Typically the majority of player interaction is limited to clicking to keep the text, graphics and sound moving as if they were turning a page (many recent games offer "play" or "fast-forward" toggles that make this unnecessary), while making narrative choices along the way. Another main characteristic of visual novels is their strong emphasis on the prose, as the narration in visual novels is delivered through text. This characteristic makes playing visual novels similar to reading a book.

Most visual novels have multiple storylines and more than one ending; the mechanic in these cases typically consists of intermittent multiple-choice decision points, where the player selects a direction in which to take the game. For example, in a dating simulator-themed visual novel, the player is prompted to pick different characters to date which, in turn, leads to a different ending. This style of gameplay is similar to story-driven interactive fiction, or the shorter and less detailed real-life gamebook books. Many fans of visual novels hold them up as exceptions to the relatively weak storytelling in video games overall.

Some visual novels do not limit themselves into merely interactive fictions, but also incorporate other elements into them. An example of this approach is Symphonic Rain, where the player is required to play a musical instrument of some sort, and attain a good score in order to advance. Usually such an element is related as a plot device in the game.

Fan-created novel games are reasonably popular; there are a number of free game engines and construction kits aimed at making them easy to construct, most notably NScripter, KiriKiri and Ren'Py.

Many visual novels use voice actors to provide voices for the non-player characters in the game. Often, the protagonist (that is, the player character) is left unvoiced, even when the rest of the characters are fully voiced. This choice is meant to aid the player in identifying with the protagonist and to avoid having to record large amounts of dialogue, as the main character typically has the most speaking lines due to the branching nature of visual novels.

Narrative branches

Non-linear branching storylines are a common trend in visual novels, which frequently use multiple branching storylines to achieve multiple different endings, allowing non-linear freedom of choice along the way, similar to a choose-your-own-adventure novel. Decision points within a visual novel often present players with the option of altering the course of events during the game, leading to many different possible outcomes. An acclaimed example is Zero Escape: Virtue's Last Reward, where nearly every action and dialogue choice can lead to entirely new branching paths and endings. Each path only reveals certain aspects of the overall storyline and it is only after uncovering all the possible different paths and outcomes, through multiple playthroughs, that every component comes together to form a coherent, well-written story.

The digital medium in visual novels allow for significant improvements, such as being able to fully explore multiple aspects and perspectives of a story. Another improvement is having hidden decision points that are automatically determined based on the player's past decisions. In Fate/stay night, for example, the way the player character behaved towards non-player characters during the course of the game affects the way they react to the player character in later scenes, such as whether or not they choose to help in life-or-death situations. This would be far more difficult to track with physical books. More importantly, visual novels do not face the same length restrictions as a physical book. For example, the total word count of the English fan translation of Fate/stay night, taking all the branching paths into account, exceeds that of The Lord of the Rings by almost 80%. This significant increase in length allows visual novels to tell stories as long and complex as those often found in traditional novels, while still maintaining a branching path structure, and allowing them to focus on complex stories with mature themes and consistent plots in a way which Choose Your Own Adventure books were unable to do due to their physical limitations.

Many visual novels often revolve almost entirely around character interactions and dialogue choices usually featuring complex branching dialogues and often presenting the player's possible responses word-for-word as the player character would say them. Such titles revolving around relationship-building, including visual novels as well as dating simulations, such as Tokimeki Memorial, and some role-playing video games, such as Persona, often give choices that have a different number of associated "mood points" that influence a player character's relationship and future conversations with a non-player character. These games often feature a day-night cycle with a time scheduling system that provides context and relevance to character interactions, allowing players to choose when and if to interact with certain characters, which in turn influences their responses during later conversations.

It is not uncommon for visual novels to have morality systems. A well-known example is the 2005 title School Days, an animated visual novel that Kotaku describes as going well beyond the usual "black and white choice systems" (referring to video games such as Mass Effect, Fallout 3 and BioShock) where you "pick a side and stick with it" while leaving "the expansive middle area between unexplored". School Days instead encourages players to explore the grey, neutral middle-ground in order to view the more interesting, "bad" endings, i. e. an ending where a character dies or the main protagonist does not advance towards the flow of the story.

Kinetic novels

Visual novels with non-branching plots, similar to a conventional novel or a graphic novel in multimedia form. Higurashi When They Cry, Muv-Luv Alternative, and Digital: A Love Story are known as kinetic novels. The term was first used by the publisher Key for their title Planetarian: The Reverie of a Little Planet.

RPG hybrids
There are role-playing video games that feature visual novel-style elements. A well-known example in the West is Mistwalker's Lost Odyssey, an RPG that features a series of visual novel-style flashback sequences called "A Thousand Years of Dreams". These sequences were penned by an award-winning Japanese short story writer, Kiyoshi Shigematsu. Another title is the Arc System Works fighting game series BlazBlue, which plays off of a complex fantasy setting where a one-hundred-year period is reset indefinitely with many variables. The many branching storylines in Story Mode can serve as stand-alone stories, but players must consider them together along with Arcade Mode stories to be able to fully understand the universe.

Another successful example is Sega's Sakura Wars series, which combined tactical role-playing game combat with visual novel elements, introducing a real-time branching choice system where, during an event or conversation, the player must choose an action or dialogue choice within a time limit, or to not respond at all within that time. The player's choice, or lack thereof, affects the player character's relationship with other characters and in turn the characters' performance in battle, the direction of the storyline, and the ending. Later games in the series added several variations, including an action gauge that can be raised up or down depending on the situation, and a gauge that the player can manipulate using the analog stick depending on the situation. The success of Sakura Wars led to a wave of games that combine role-playing and visual novel elements, including Thousand Arms, Riviera: The Promised Land, and Luminous Arc.

Style

Despite using the narrative style of literature, visual novels have evolved a style somewhat different from print novels. In general, visual novels are more likely to be narrated in the first person than the third, and typically present events from the point of view of only one character.

In the typical visual novel, the graphics comprise a set of generic backgrounds (normally just one for each location in the game), with character  superimposed onto these; the perspective is usually first-person, with the protagonist remaining unseen. At certain key moments in the plot, special event CG computer graphics are displayed instead; these are more detailed images, drawn specially for that scene rather than being composed from predefined elements, which often use more cinematic camera angles and include the protagonist. These event CGs can usually be viewed at any time once they have been "unlocked" by finding them in-game; this provides a motivation to replay the game and try making different decisions, as it is normally impossible to view all special events on a single play-through.

Up until the 1990s, the majority of visual novels utilized pixel art. This was particularly common on the NEC PC-9801 format, which showcased what is considered to be some of the best pixel art in the history of video games, with a popular example being Policenauts in 1994. There have also been visual novels that use live-action stills or video footage, such as several Sound Novel games by Chunsoft. The most successful example is Machi, one of the most celebrated games in Japan, where it was voted No. 5 in a 2006 Famitsu reader poll of top 100 games of all time. The game resembled a live-action television drama, but allowing players to explore multiple character perspectives and affect the outcomes. Another successful example is 428: Shibuya Scramble, which received a perfect score of 40 out of 40 from Famitsu magazine.

History

The history of visual novels dates back to Portopia Serial Murder Case (1983). It featured non-linear elements, which include traveling between different areas in a generally open world, a branching dialogue conversation system where the story develops through entering commands and receiving responses from other characters, and making choices that determine the dialogues and order of events as well as alternate outcomes, though there is only one true culprit while the others are red herrings. It also features a phone that could be used to dial any number to contact several non-player characters. The game was well received in Japan for its well-told storyline and surprising twist ending, and for allowing multiple ways to achieve objectives. Shortly after, in 1988, Snatcher appeared, developed by Hideo Kojima and released for the PC-8801 and MSX2 in 1988, in which a cyberpunk detective hunts down a serial killer. Another more non-linear early example was Mirrors, released by Soft Studio Wing for the PC-8801 and FM Towns computers in 1990; it featured a branching narrative, multiple endings, and audio CD music.

A common feature used in visual novels is having multiple protagonists giving different perspectives on the story. EVE Burst Error (1995), developed by Hiroyuki Kanno and C's Ware, introduced a unique twist to the system by allowing the player to switch between both protagonists at any time during the game, instead of finishing one protagonist's scenario before playing the other. EVE Burst Error often requires the player to have both protagonists co-operate with each other at various points during the game, with choices in one scenario affecting the other.

An important milestone in the history of visual novels was YU-NO: A girl who chants love at the bound of this world (1996), which was developed by Hiroyuki Kanno and is ELF's most famous visual novel. It featured non-linear storytelling, with a science fiction plot revolving around time travel and parallel universes. The player travels between parallel worlds using a Reflector device, which employs a limited number of stones to mark a certain position as a returning location, so that if the player decides to retrace their steps, they can go to an alternate universe to the time they have used a Reflector stone. The game also implemented an original system called Automatic Diverge Mapping System (ADMS), which displays a screen that the player can check at any time to see the direction in which they are heading along the branching plot lines.

YU-NO revolutionized the visual novel industry, particularly with its ADMS system. Audiences soon began demanding large-scope plotlines and musical scores of similar quality and ambition to that of YU-NO, and that responded by hiring talent. According to Gamasutra: "The genre became an all-new arena for young artists and musicians once again, with companies willing to take chances on fresh blood; the market thrived with the excitement and the risks that were being taken, and became a hotbed of creativity". The branching timeline system was influential, opening "the door for visual novels to become more elaborate and have a greater range of narrative arcs, without requiring the player to replay the game over and over again". According to Nintendo Life, "the modern visual novel genre would simply not exist without" YU-NO. Branching timeline systems similar to YU-NO also later appeared in role-playing video games such as Radiant Historia (2010) and the PSP version of Tactics Ogre (2010).

Chunsoft sound novels such as Machi (1998) and 428: Shibuya Scramble (2008) developed the multiple-perspective concept further. They allow the player to alternate between the perspectives of several or more different characters, making choices with one character that have consequences for other characters. 428 in particular features up to 85 different possible endings. Another popular visual novel featuring multiple perspectives is Fate/stay night (2004).

Content and genres

Many visual novels are centered on drama, particularly themes involving romance or family, but visual novels centered on science fiction, fantasy fiction, and horror fiction are not uncommon.

Dōjinshi games (dōjin soft)

Dōjinshi (同人誌, often transliterated as doujinshi) is the Japanese term for self-published (fan-made) works. This includes (but is not limited to) dōjin games (同人ゲーム), also sometimes called dōjin soft (同人ソフト). These visual novel-style games are created as fan-made works based on pre-existing fandoms (usually anime and manga, but also for TV shows or even other pre-existing games and visual novels). Dōjinshi games are often based on romance (or shipping) between two characters, known as an otome game (乙女ゲーム) or dating sim; sometimes becoming sexual (or hentai), known as an eroge (エロゲ, a portmanteau of erotic game: (エロチックゲーム)).

Erotic content

Many visual novels also qualify as eroge, an abbreviation of 'erotic game'. These games feature sexually explicit imagery that is accessed by completing certain routes in the game, most often depicting the game's protagonist having sex with one of the game's other characters. Like other pornographic media in Japan, scenes depicting genitalia are censored in their original Japanese releases, only becoming uncensored if the game is licensed outside Japan with all art assets intact. Certain eroge titles receive re-releases which exclude explicit content in order to be sold to a younger audience, such as ports to consoles or handheld systems where sexually explicit content is not allowed, and storylines referring to aforementioned sex scenes are often omitted from  adaptations into other media, unless that media is also pornographic in nature, such as a hentai anime.

Traditionally, PC-based visual novels have contained risque scenes even if the overall focus is not erotic (similar to the "obligatory sex scene" in Hollywood action films). However, the vast majority of console ports do not contain adult material, and a number of recent PC games have also been targeted at the all-age market; for example, all of Key's titles come in censored versions, although the content might still not be appropriate for children, and three have never contained erotic content at all. Also, all of KID's titles are made with general audiences in mind.

However, some of these games are later re-released with the addition of erotic scenes, or have a sequel with such. For example, Little Busters! was first released as an all-ages visual novel, but a version with erotic scenes titled Little Busters! Ecstasy came out later, and though Clannad is also all-ages, its spinoff Tomoyo After: It's a Wonderful Life is not.

Often, the beginning of the eroge will be dedicated to introducing the characters and developing the protagonist's relationship with them, before the protagonist sexually interacts with other characters, for example, Lump of Sugar games such as Tayutama: Kiss on my Deity and Everlasting Summer do this. The effect it has on the reader is the H-scenes (sex scenes) will have a stronger emotional impact for the two (or possibly more) characters.

Some of Japan's earliest adventure games were erotic bishōjo games developed by Koei. In 1982, they released Night Life, the first commercial erotic computer game. It was a graphic adventure, with sexually explicit images. That same year, they released another erotic title, Danchi Tsuma no Yūwaku (Seduction of the Condominium Wife), which was an early adventure game with colour graphics, owing to the eight-color palette of the NEC PC-8001 computer. It became a hit, helping Koei become a major software company. Other now-famous companies such as Enix, Square and Nihon Falcom also produced similar erotic games in the early 1980s before they became famous for their role-playing video games. While some early erotic games integrate the erotic content into a thoughtful and nuanced storylines, others often used it as a simplistic vehicle for fetishism, pleasure, an aid of the lightheaded themes that encourage stress relief or to portray nuances of sexuality. The Japanese game Pai Touch! involves the protagonist gaining the ability to change the size of girls' breasts, and the adventures that ensue in trying to choose which girl to use the power on the most.

Another subgenre is called , in which sexual gratification of the player is the main focus of the game.

Science fiction
In 1986, Square released the science fiction adventure game Suishō no Dragon for the NES console. The game featured several innovations, including the use of animation in many of the scenes rather than still images, and an interface resembling that of a point-and-click interface for a console, like Portopia Serial Murder Case, but making use of visual icons rather than text-based ones to represent various actions. Like the NES version of Portopia Serial Murder Case, it featured a cursor that could be moved around the screen using the D-pad to examine the scenery, though the cursor in Suishō no Dragon was also used to click on the action icons.

Hideo Kojima (of Metal Gear fame) was inspired by Portopia Serial Murder Case to enter the video game industry, and later produced his own adventure games. After completing the stealth game Metal Gear, his first graphic adventure was released by Konami the following year: Snatcher (1988), an ambitious cyberpunk detective novel, graphic adventure, that was highly regarded at the time for pushing the boundaries of video game storytelling, cinematic cut scenes, and mature content. It also featured a post-apocalyptic science fiction setting, an amnesiac protagonist, and some light gun shooter segments. It was praised for its graphics, soundtrack, high quality writing comparable to a novel, voice acting comparable to a film or radio drama, and in-game computer database with optional documents that flesh out the game world. The Sega CD version of Snatcher was for a long time the only major visual novel game to be released in America, where it, despite low sales, gained a cult following.

Following Metal Gear 2: Solid Snake, Kojima produced his next graphic adventure, Policenauts (1994), a point-and-click adventure notable for being an early example of extensive voice recording in video games. It also featured a hard science fiction setting, a theme revolving around space exploration, a plot inspired by the ancient Japanese tale of Urashima Taro, and some occasional full-motion video cut scenes. The gameplay was largely similar to Snatcher, but with the addition of a point-and-click interface and some first-person shooter segments. Policenauts also introduced summary screens, which act to refresh the player's memory of the plot upon reloading a saved game (save), an element Kojima would later use in Metal Gear Solid. The PlayStation version of Policenauts could also read the memory card and give some easter egg dialogues if a save file of Konami's dating sim Tokimeki Memorial is present, a technique Kojima would also later use in Metal Gear Solid. From 1997 to 1999, Kojima developed the three Tokimeki Memorial Drama Series titles, which were adaptations of Tokimeki Memorial in a visual novel adventure game format. Other acclaimed examples of science fiction visual novels include ELF's Yu-No (1996) and 5pb.'s Chaos;Head (2008) and Steins;Gate (2009).

Nakige and Utsuge
The genres are somewhat fluid and were largely pioneered in parallel during the late 1990s through the early 2000s by the works of Key co-founder, scenario writer, lyricist, and composer Jun Maeda; and through the works of  through his affiliated company Âge, particularly Kimi ga Nozomu Eien and its successors, notably Muv-Luv. The ultimate goal of nakige and utsuge are emotional connection with the characters, through exploration of their personalities and evolving interrelationships through the drama of the game's storyline, and to emotionally resonate with the player; repeated playthroughs across a rich cast of characters offers a multi-layered narrative. Games from publisher Key often follow a similar formula: a comedic first half, with a heart-warming romantic middle, followed by a tragic separation, and finally (though not always) an emotional reunion. This formula was influenced primarily by Hiroyuki Kanno's YU-NO: A Girl Who Chants Love at the Bound of this World (1996) and Leaf's To Heart (1997), and was further developed in One: Kagayaku Kisetsu e (1998) by Tactics. After One was complete, the development team quit Tactics to form Key where they developed their first title Kanon, also based upon this formula. According to Satoshi Todome in his book, A History of Adult Games, Kanon was "heavily hyped [and] had gamers impatient until its release. It was only one game released by Key so far, and yet [it] had already sent major shockwaves around the industry. And yet another game [Air], two years later, sent even more shockwaves. Air was equally hyped and well received."

Key's "crying game" formula used successfully in One and Kanon was later adopted by other visual novel companies to create their own "crying games". Examples of this include: Kana: Little Sister (1999) by Digital Object, the Memories Off series (1999 onwards) by KID, D.C.: Da Capo (2002) by Circus, Wind: A Breath of Heart (2002) by Minori, and Snow (2003) by Studio Mebius (under Visual Art's).

One of the most acclaimed visual novels of this subgenre was Key's Clannad, written by Jun Maeda, Yūichi Suzumoto, and Kai and Tōya Okano. Released in 2004, its story revolved around the central theme of the value of having a family. It was voted the best bishōjo game of all time in a poll held by Dengeki G's Magazine. It served as the basis for a media franchise, with successful adaptations into a light novel, manga, animated film, and acclaimed anime series.

In 2008, several of Key's visual novels were voted in the Dengeki poll of the ten most tear-inducing games of all time, including Clannad at No. 2, Kanon at No. 4, Air at No. 7, and Little Busters! at No. 10. In 2011, several visual novels were also voted in Famitsu'''s poll of 20 most tear-inducing games of all time, with Clannad at No. 4, Steins;Gate at No. 6, Air at No. 7, Little Busters! at No. 10, and 428: Shibuya Scramble at No. 14.

Horror
After developing The Portopia Serial Murder Case, Chunsoft released Otogiriso in 1992.Koichi Nakamura conceived the title after showing his work on the Dragon Quest role-playing video games to a girl he was dating. On finding she did not enjoy them, he was encouraged to make a video game that he described as "for people who haven't played games before." Influenced by the early survival horror game Sweet Home, he developed it into a horror-themed interactive story. Chunsoft's next release, Kamaitachi no Yoru was also a best seller and would prove to be highly influential.Higurashi no Naku Koro ni (When They Cry) was a 2002 horror-themed visual novel by 07th Expansion, influenced by the "crying game" subgenre. Ryukishi07 of 07th Expansion mentioned in 2004 how he was influenced by Key's works and Tsukihime during the planning of Higurashi no Naku Koro ni. He played their games, as well as other visual novels, as a reference and analyzed them to try to determine why they were so popular. He decided that the secret was that the stories would start with ordinary, enjoyable days, but then a sudden event would occur leading the player to cry from shock. He used a similar model as the basis for Higurashi but instead of leading the player to cry, Ryukishi07 wanted to scare the player with the addition of horror elements. Other examples of horror-themed visual novels include: Animamundi: Dark Alchemist, Higanbana no Saku Yoru ni, Umineko no Naku Koro ni, Ookami Kakushi, Imabikisou, Saya no Uta, Doki Doki Literature Club!, and Corpse Party.

Visual novels in the Western world

Prior to the year 2000, few Japanese visual novels were translated into other languages. As with the visual novel genre in general, a majority of titles released for the PC have been eroge, with Hirameki's now-discontinued AnimePlay series a notable exception. As of 2014, JAST USA and MangaGamer are the two most prolific publishers of translated visual novels for the PC; both primarily release eroge, but have begun to diversify into the all-ages market in recent years, with titles such as Steins;Gate and Higurashi no Naku Koro ni respectively. In addition to official commercial translations, a vibrant fan translation scene exists, which has translated many free visual novels (such as Narcissu and True Remembrance) and a few commercial works (such as Umineko no Naku Koro ni and Policenauts) into English. Fan translations of Japanese visual novels into languages other than English such as Chinese, French, German and Russian are commonplace as well.

English translations of Japanese visual novels on video game consoles were rare until the release of the Nintendo DS, though some games with visual novel elements had been published in the Western world before then, such as Hideo Kojima's Snatcher. Following the success of mystery titles for the Nintendo DS such as Capcom's Ace Attorney series (which began on the Game Boy Advance in 2001), Cing's Hotel Dusk series (beginning in 2006), and Level-5's Professor Layton series (beginning in 2007), Japanese visual novels have been published in other countries more frequently. The success of these games has sparked a resurgence in the adventure game genre outside Japan.Gameplay of the Week – Two new engaging DS adventures hit the spot, The Olympian

GameSpot has credited Phoenix Wright: Ace Attorney in particular for revitalizing the adventure game genre. The success of the Ace Attorney series was followed soon after by the even greater success of Level-5's Professor Layton in 2007. Both have since become some of the best selling adventure game franchises, with Ace Attorney selling over 3.9 million units worldwide and Professor Layton selling over 9.5 million units worldwide by 2010. Their success has led to an increase in Japanese visual novels being localized for release outside Japan, including: KID's Ever 17: The Out of Infinity (2002), Cing's Another Code series (2005 onwards), Marvelous Entertainment's Lux-Pain (2008), Chunsoft's 999: Nine Hours, Nine Persons, Nine Doors (2010), and Capcom's Ghost Trick: Phantom Detective (2010). In more recent years, several modern Western narrative adventure games have drawn comparisons to visual novels, including Telltale Games titles such as The Walking Dead (2012), and Dontnod Entertainment's Life Is Strange (2015); the latter's creative director cited visual novels such as Danganronpa (2010) as an influence.

Additionally, there have been some visual novels developed mainly in English, and intended for an English-speaking audience; one of the earliest commercially-available examples on a mainstream platform is 2004's Sprung, and in more recent times, the availability of the genre has increased, with notable examples being Doki Doki Literature Club! and VA-11 HALL-A''. Other languages have been the focus in visual novels, including Spanish, French, Russian and Mandarin, which have seen increased success due to the popularity of the genre.

List of best-selling visual novels

Sales data for visual novels is frequently unavailable; the sales listed below can be significantly outdated as some of the sources are over a decade old, and series qualified for an entry could be missing. These lists should be referenced carefully.

Free visual novels do not appear in these lists due to the unreliability of download numbers and for consistency with other best-selling lists.

Series

Standalone

See also
 Hypertext fiction
 List of video games based on anime or manga
 List of visual novel engines
 Motion comic
 The Visual Novel Database
 Visual novel engines

Notes

References

External links

Visual Novel Database

Video game genres
 
Wasei-eigo